Jean Efala Komguep (born 11 August 1992) is a Cameroonian footballer who plays as a goalkeeper for Nigerian Professional Football League club Akwa United and the Cameroon national team. He previously represented the Cameroon U20 national team.

Career

Club
Efala was born in Mfou. He began his professional playing career in 2010 to Fovu Baham. He was later sold to Coton Sport F.C. for whom he appeared in several matches, including in the CAF Champions League.

In 2018, he joined Nigerian side Akwa United and played seven matches en route to the club's first league title in 2021.

International career
In 2011 Efala was called up to the Cameroon under-20 national team to take part in the FIFA World Cup Under-20. He received his first international call-up against Tanzania on 6 February 2013 and has since been called up to the senior national team several times.

Honours
Coton Sport
 Elite One: 2013, 2014, 2015
 Cameroonian Cup: 2014

Akwa United
 NPFL: 2020–21

References

External links 
 

1992 births
Living people
Cameroonian footballers
Association football goalkeepers
Cameroon international footballers
Cameroon youth international footballers
2021 Africa Cup of Nations players
Fovu Baham players
Coton Sport FC de Garoua players
People from Centre Region (Cameroon)